Yazıköy can refer to:

 Yazıköy, Çaycuma
 Yazıköy, Gerede
 Yazıköy, Ilgaz
 Yazıköy, Kocaköy
 Yazıköy, Refahiye